Ilmensky 1-y is a rural locality (a khutor) in Mikhaylovka Urban Okrug, Volgograd Oblast, Russia. The population was 245 as of 2010. There are 19 streets.

Geography 
Ilmensky 1-y is located 20 km southwest of Mikhaylovka. Starorechensky is the nearest rural locality.

References 

Rural localities in Mikhaylovka urban okrug